Jeremy David Hubbard (born August 19, 1972 in Glenwood Springs, Colorado) is an American news anchor for KDVR-TV and KWGN-TV in Denver. He was a New York-based correspondent for ABC News, and reported for all ABC News broadcasts and platforms, including Good Morning America, World News with Diane Sawyer, and Nightline.

Education
Hubbard grew up in western Colorado and moved to Utah and Garden City, Kansas, before graduating from high school in Newton, Kansas in 1991. He graduated from Wichita State University in 1996.  .

Career
Prior to his assignment at the anchor desk, Hubbard was a Chicago-based correspondent for NewsOne, the affiliate news service of ABC News. NewsOne provides live and packaged news reports for more than 200 affiliates and clients in the U.S. and around the world.

Hubbard joined the network in spring 2007 and has reported on politics, the economy, severe weather and breaking news. Most recently, he covered several national stories for NewsOne, including the deadly campus shootings at Northern Illinois University, and last month's  string of tornadoes that ravaged the southern U.S.

Before joining ABC News, Hubbard was a reporter and anchor at KDVR-TV in Denver, where he covered the battle over illegal immigration. He traveled to the Mexican border, documenting the efforts of the controversial Minuteman Project to keep illegal immigrants from entering the U.S. Hubbard wrote, produced, and reported Battle for the Border, an award-winning documentary on the issue.

From 1998 to 2004, Hubbard worked at KMBC-TV in Kansas City, where he covered several high-profile national stories. He reported from Texas after the Space Shuttle Columbia disaster, and traveled to Terre Haute, Indiana for the execution of convicted Oklahoma City bomber Timothy McVeigh. Hubbard co-produced, co-wrote and anchored Eye for an Eye, an award-winning documentary about McVeigh's execution.

From March 2008 to July 2010, Jeremy Hubbard was co-anchor of ABC's early morning news programs, World News Now and America This Morning, with Vinita Nair.

Hubbard left ABC News May 20, 2011 and returned to KDVR-TV and its sister station KWGN-TV as a news anchor.

Honors and awards
Hubbard has been recognized with several honors for his reporting, including a national Edward R. Murrow and the national Sigma Delta Chi Award from the Society of Professional Journalists. He won three regional Edward R. Murrow Awards and regional Emmy Awards for both reporting and anchoring.

References

External links
Biodata
New York Daily News report on Hubbard's move to NYC
WSU website 
Media Bistro report on Hubbard

Personal Life 
He is married to his wife Taunia Hottman-Hubbard on September 30th 2001. He is the father of two kids a son, Charlie (born October 7th, 2010), and a daughter, Bunny (born February 19th, 2013). He has a dog named Teddy. 

1972 births
American reporters and correspondents
American television journalists
ABC News personalities
Living people
People from Garden City, Kansas
People from Harvey County, Kansas
People from Chicago
People from Glenwood Springs, Colorado
Wichita State University alumni
Television anchors from Denver
Television anchors from Kansas City, Missouri
American male journalists